Syed Arshad Ali (born 10 April 1971) is a Pakistani jurist who has been Justice of the Peshawar High Court since 16 June 2017.

Early life and education
Ali was born in Swabi District on 10 April 1971. He got his LLB from Khyber Law College associated with University of Peshawar in 1993.

Judicial career
He registered as an advocate of High Court in 1996. Until 2007, he worked with "Afridi, Shah and Minallah", a law firm located in Peshawar. Later, he started his own firm in Peshawar and named it "Syed Arshad Ali and Associates". In 2012, he started practicing as an advocate of Supreme Court. He became Supreme Court Bar Association's member for life. He remained member Peshawar High Court Bar Association and member of Peshawar Bar Association, District Courts. As an advocate, he specialized representing banks, hospitals, and universities. He joined Peshawar High Court (PHC) as an additional judge on 16 June 2017. He became permanent member of the PHC bench on 31 May 2019.

References

1971 births
Living people
Judges of the Peshawar High Court
Pakistani judges